Troy "Diesel" Michael Davis (born January 6, 1991) is a former American football player. Davis played college football at UCF. He was signed by the New York Jets in 2013 as an undrafted free agent. Davis also spent time with the Dallas Cowboys of the NFL while also having stints with the Hamilton Tiger-Cats and the Toronto Argonauts of the CFL.

Early years 

Davis attended Berkmar High School in Lilburn, Georgia. Davis was named Academic Athlete of the Year in 2007. He was an honorable mention pick in his junior season and was a first-team all-county linebacker in his senior year.

College career

Freshman season 

In his freshman season (2009), he appeared in 10 games but didn't record any statistics.

Sophomore season 

In his Sophomore season (2010), he appeared in 14 games in which he recorded 26 Tackles, 5.5 Sacks, a forced fumble, 6 pass deflections and one Interception.

Junior season 

In his Junior season (2011), he recorded 29 Tackles, 5 Sacks, 2 Pass deflections and a forced fumble in 12 regular season games. He was selected to Phil Steele's All-C-USA Third-team following his Junior season.

Senior season 

In his Senior season (2012), he appeared in 14 games in which he recorded 72 Tackles, a career high 8 Sacks, 3 Forced fumbles and 4 Pass deflections. He was selected to both the All-C-USA First-team and Phil Steele's All-C-USA First-team. On December 19, 2012, he was selected as UCF's Outstanding Defensive Lineman at the UCF Football Awards Banquet following his senior season.

Professional career

New York Jets 

On April 27, 2013, Davis signed with the New York Jets as an undrafted free agent. He was released on August 31, 2013  but was signed to the team's practice squad a day later. On September 25, 2013, he was released from the practice squad  before being re-signed to the squad on October 2, 2013. Ten days later on October 12, he was promoted to the active roster. Davis made his NFL debut in week 8 of the 2013 season on October 27 against the Cincinnati Bengals. Playing on special teams he recorded two tackles and made a 7-yard kickoff return after collecting a squibber. He was released on August 30, 2014.

Dallas Cowboys 
The Dallas Cowboys signed Davis to their practice squad on October 21, 2014. The Cowboys waived Davis on May 8, 2015.

Hamilton Tiger-Cats
On September 27, 2015, Davis signed a practice roster agreement with the Hamilton Tiger-Cats of the Canadian Football League. Davis was activated to play in the East Division Final on November 21, 2015, but recorded no stats playing in that game. After signing a contract extension with the Tiger-Cats on December 16, 2015, Davis was released during their training camp on June 15, 2016.

Toronto Argonauts

On October 7, 2016, Davis signed with the Toronto Argonauts of the Canadian Football League.  On November 26, 2017  his Toronto Argonauts won the championship trophy, the Grey Cup, in Ottawa. Davis was released on June 1, 2019. He retired afterwards.

Coaching career
On April 23, 2022 Davis was hired by the Seckinger High School

Personal life 
He is the son of Oneal Murphy and Keisha Davis. He majored in sports and exercise science while in college.

References

External links 
Toronto Argonauts bio

New York Jets bio

1991 births
Living people
People from Lawrenceville, Georgia
Sportspeople from the Atlanta metropolitan area
Players of American football from Georgia (U.S. state)
African-American players of American football
American football linebackers
UCF Knights football players
New York Jets players
Dallas Cowboys players
African-American players of Canadian football
Canadian football defensive linemen
Toronto Argonauts players
21st-century African-American sportspeople